Božidar Kavran (1913–1948) was a member of the Croatian World War II Ustaše regime.

Kavran was born in Zagreb on 22 September 1913. He served as leader of the Ustaše from May 1943 onwards. He attempted to organize a rebellion against the Communist Yugoslav government in the post-war years. He led a group of exiled Croatian fighters into the country on 4 July 1948. They called this Operation April 10. However, he was captured by the UDBA in Operation Gvardijan  and executed in 1948.

References

Bibliography

 

1913 births
1948 deaths
Military personnel from Zagreb
Croatian collaborators with Fascist Italy
Croatian collaborators with Nazi Germany
Executed Yugoslav collaborators with Nazi Germany
People executed by Yugoslavia
Executed Croatian people
Croatian anti-communists
Ustaše
Yugoslav anti-communists